Hudson Island, measuring  in area, is a Baffin Island offshore island located in the Arctic Archipelago in the territory of Nunavut. The uninhabited island lies in the Labrador Sea, east of Lupton Channel. Other islands also in the immediate vicinity of Blunt Peninsula (the tip of Hall Peninsula) include the Harper Islands, Lefferts Island, Bear Island, and Little Hall Island.

References 

Islands of Baffin Island
Islands of the Labrador Sea
Uninhabited islands of Qikiqtaaluk Region